Pentila umangiana is a butterfly in the family Lycaenidae. It is found in Nigeria, Cameroon, the Republic of the Congo, from the Democratic Republic of the Congo to Sudan and in Uganda, Tanzania and Zambia. The habitat consists of forests.

Subspecies
P. u. umangiana (Democratic Republic of the Congo: Mayumbe, Mongala, Bas-Uele, Tshopo, Ituri, Tshuapa, Equateur and Sankuru)
P. u. connectens Hulstaert, 1924 (southern Sudan, Uganda, Democratic Republic of the Congo: south-eastern Ituri, Tanzania: north-west to the Bukoba Region)
P. u. fontainei Stempffer & Bennett, 1961 (Democratic Republic of the Congo: Haut-Uele)
P. u. meridionalis Berger, 1981 (Democratic Republic of the Congo: Shaba and Lualaba, Zambia: Mwinilunga District)
P. u. mpanda Congdon, Kielland & Collins, 1998 (Tanzania: Mpanda district)
P. u. prodita Schultze, 1923 (Nigeria, Cameroon and Congo)

References

Butterflies described in 1898
Poritiinae
Butterflies of Africa
Taxa named by Per Olof Christopher Aurivillius